Shahriyar Atababayev, better known by his stage name Xpert, is an Azerbaijani rapper, songwriter.

Life 
Shahriyar Zahid Oglu Atababayev was born on September 30, 1990 in Baku.In 1996 he entered secondary school No. 292 and graduated from the school in 2007. In 2007 he entered the Faculty of Turkish language and literature of Qafqaz University, and in 2012 he entered the magistracy and graduated from it. He is married and has a daughter named Mary.

Biography 
Shahriyar Atababayev was born in September 1990 in Baku, Azerbaijan.
 
He graduated from the Faculty of Turkish Language and Literature (Qafqaz University) in 2011 with a bachelor's degree and in 2014 with a master's degree.
 
Shahriyar met a rapper and producer nicknamed A4 and started his rap career in 2009.
 
Xpert is one of the founders of Synaps Production. Azerbaijan's most famous rap company.
 
He worked with many local and foreign artists as a musician, producer and director.
 
He is currently CEO of the record label "101".

Discography

Singles

Albums

Solo albums 
 Makar10 (2011) 
 Akula (2013) 
 Qassab (2016)

Compilation albums 
 Qanun Beatz "Maddə 1 The Mixtape"
 Rapsychology bootleg

EPs 
 Sarkoma 
 La Poax(2013)  
 7EDDI

References

1990 births
Living people
Azerbaijani rappers
21st-century Azerbaijani male singers